Wayne Duvall (born May 29, 1958) is an American actor known for appearing as Homer Stokes in O Brother, Where Art Thou?, as well recurring roles as the television series Billions, The District, The Leftovers, BrainDead, The Righteous Gemstones and others.

He has also appeared in films like Apollo 13, Leatherheads, Duplicity, Lincoln, American Animals, Richard Jewell, The Hunt, and The Trial of the Chicago 7, as well as in Broadway theatre productions, most notably the original New York run of 1984.

He was born in Silver Spring, Maryland and is a cousin of the actor Robert Duvall.

Filmography

Film

Television

Video games

References

External links 

Living people
American actors
Actors from Maryland
Male actors from Maryland
1958 births
People from Silver Spring, Maryland